The Hunt is the sixth full-length album by Swedish heavy metal band Grand Magus. It was released on 25 May 2012 on Nuclear Blast. This is their first album with new drummer Ludwig "Ludde" Witt.

Track listing
"Starlight Slaughter" – 4:19
"Sword of the Ocean" – 4:28
"Valhalla Rising" – 4:52
"Storm King" – 4:20
"Silver Moon" – 4:43
"The Hunt" – 5:27
"Son of the Last Breath (I. Nattfödd/II. Vedergällning)" – 6:49
"Iron Hand" – 3:44
"Draksådd" – 5:48
"Silver Moon" (demo version) – 4:37 (bonus track)
"Storm King" (demo version) – 3:58 (bonus track)
"Sword of the Ocean" (demo version) – 4:15 (bonus track)

Personnel 
Janne "JB" Christoffersson – vocals, guitars
Mats "Fox" Skinner – bass
Ludwig "Ludde" Witt – drums

References 

Grand Magus albums
2012 albums
Nuclear Blast albums